Gaocun Town is a town and the county seat of Mayang Miao Autonomous County in Hunan, China. The town was divided into 37 villages and communities in May 2016, the seat of local government is at Gaocun.().

References

Mayang Miao Autonomous County
County seats in Hunan